Isaac Sailmaker (born Isaac Zeilmaker; 1633 – 28 June 1721) was an etcher and marine painter of the Baroque period, who had a long career in England. He was referred to in contemporary books and journals as "the father of British sea painting", but was eclipsed by his contemporaries, the Dutch marine painters Willem van de Velde the Elder and his son Willem van de Velde the Younger, who for a period dominated the London market. Sailmaker was commissioned by the English Lord Protector, Oliver Cromwell, to paint the English fleet at Fort-Mardyck.

The attribution of Sailmaker’s surviving paintings has been problematic, as his works were never signed. Other paintings have been attributed to him on the basis of engravings after his work; his painting of the second Eddystone Lighthouse, built in 1709, was firmly attributed to Sailmaker in the 1970s on the basis of such documentary evidence. His style can also be identified by its reliance on a relatively narrow palette, principally black, greys and greens, and by minor details within his paintings, such as the way he depicted flags and gilding.

Life 
What is known about Isaac Sailmaker's life comes from notes published by the 18th century engraver, artist, and antiquary George Vertue.

Sailmaker, whose family name was probably Zeilmaker, was born in 1633 in the village of Scheveningen in the Dutch Republic. He came to London at a young age and became one of the first apprentices of George Geldorp or Gelders, a Flemish portraitist and art dealer who had bought a studio after moving to London from the Dutch Republic. As a portraitist, Geldorp did not provide his young pupil with a typical marine artist's education, and it is unlikely Sailmaker's interest in marine painting was inspired by his teacher.

An exact contemporary of the Dutch marine painter Willem van de Velde the Younger, Sailmaker was eclipsed by van de Velde and his father Willem van de Velde the Elder when they moved to London in the 1670s. Sailmaker, along with Jan van de Hagen, Jacob Knijff, and the most talented of the group, Peter Monamy, were members of the Younger van de Velde's London studio; they all continued van de Velde's artistic style. Sailmaker, who may have been a copyist in the van de Velde studio, outlived both father and son, and was still painting into his eighties. He was one of Britain's earliest marine painters, and was referred to in contemporary catalogues and books as "the father of British sea painting". He was the first marine painter from England to depict naval action involving an English fleet using oils. Sailmaker is known to have for worked for England's Lord Protector, Oliver Cromwell during the 1650s, but most of his known works date from the 1680s. Vertue wrote that Sailmaker "employed himself always in painting views, small and great, many sea-ports and ships about England" and calls him "a constant labourer", which suggests that he produced a large body of work during his lifetime.

At the end of his life, Sailmaker was living in a house along King's Bench Walk in the Temple Bar area of the city of London. He died at home on 28 June 1721.

Artistic style and attributions 
Paintings attributed to Sailmaker include ship portraits and depictions of various naval actions. He was commissioned by Cromwell to paint the English fleet at Fort-Mardyck, prior to the fort’s capture by an Anglo-French force in September 1657, but all his commissioned paintings from Cromwell, and also from the politician John Lovett, are now lost.

Sailmaker's surviving works reveal that he painted in a basic version of the Dutch style, making portraits of ships side on, stern and bow view. His only contemporary marine artist in England, Monamy, developed a technically advanced style and produced works that were brighter and more colourful than other paintings which emerged from the Van de Velde studio—in comparison to Sailmaker, he was a more competent and realistic artist.

An advertisement for an engraving by Sailmaker in the Term Catalogue of November 1692 stated:

The attribution of his paintings has been problematic for many years, as his surviving works are unsigned. Paintings originally said to have been created by him were later reattributed to the Dutch painter Jacob Knyff. Sailmaker's identity became uncertain until the 1970s. A contemporary painting of the second Eddystone Lighthouse, built in 1709, was firmly attributed to Sailmaker in the 1970s on the basis of documentary evidence. Other paintings have been attributed to him on the basis of engravings after his work. 

Identification of Sailmaker's work is aided by characteristics of his artistic style, such as his depiction of ruffles across ships' flags, his palette, which was limited to variations of grey, green and black, and his method of using raised gold ‘blobs’ to show the gilding on his ships instead of flat brush strokes.

Reputation 
Vertue was somewhat dismissive of Sailmaker's skill as a painter, calling him "not very excellent". Horace Walpole's Anecdotes of Painting in England (1828) mentioned Sailmaker, noting only that he produced a painting commissioned by Cromwell, and that a 1714 engraving of a fleet action was made from one of Sailmaker's works.

The maritime author Edward Keble Chatterton, writing in the 1920s, criticised Sailmaker's depiction of sea waves in his painting of the Battle of Málaga (1704), and noted the complete failure by the artist to portray the sea’s awe-inspiring grandeur. He described the work as “this uninspired group of ships and galleys” which “indicates admirably how little was the English painter's skill three years before the younger van de Velde died”.

Gallery

Notes

References

Sources

Further reading

External links

 Work by Isaac Sailmaker at Tate Britain
 Works relating to Isaac Sailmaker at the British Museum

1633 births
1721 deaths
Dutch marine artists
Dutch Golden Age painters
Dutch male painters
Artists from The Hague